Restaurante Lasarte is a restaurant in Barcelona, Catalonia, Spain.  It has three Michelin stars since 2016.

References

Michelin Guide starred restaurants in Spain
Restaurants in Barcelona